The 2005–06 Eredivisie season was the 46th season of the Eredivisie in basketball, the highest professional basketball league in the Netherlands. EiffelTowers Den Bosch won their 13th national title after defeating MPC Capitals in the finals, 4–3.

Regular season

Playoffs

Individual awards 

 Most Valuable Player: Leon Rodgers (EiffelTowers Den Bosch)
 Coach of the Year: Erik Braal (Rotterdam)
 Rookie of the Year: N/A
 Statistical Player of the Year: Chris Woods (Upstairs Weert)
 First-team All-Eredivisie:
 Darnell Hinson (Landstede)
 Leon Rodgers (EiffelTowers Den Bosch)
 Travis Young (EiffelTowers Den Bosch)
 Chris Woods (Upstairs Weert)
 Travis Reed (MPC Donar)

Statistics

References

Dutch Basketball League seasons
1
Netherlands